Tomás Soares Dabó (born 20 October 1993) is a Bissau-Guinean professional footballer who plays as a right back.

Club career
Born in Bissau, Guinea-Bissau, Dabó finished his formation with S.C. Braga. He made his professional debut with their reserves on 11 August 2012, in a 2–2 second division away draw against S.L. Benfica B where he featured the full 90 minutes.

Dabó played his first match in the Primeira Liga on 26 August 2013, again starting in a 2–1 home win over C.F. Os Belenenses. After leaving the Minho Province, he was sparingly played over two seasons at fellow league team F.C. Arouca.

Dabó settled rarely in the following years, representing in quick succession S.C. Farense (Portuguese third level), FC Dacia Chișinău (Moldovan National Division), FC Metaloglobus București (Romanian Liga II), F.C. Rieti (Italian Serie C) and ŠKF Sereď (Slovak Super Liga).

International career
Dabó represented Portugal at the 2013 FIFA U-20 World Cup in Turkey, playing in the 2–2 group stage draw against South Korea as the tournament ended in round-of-16 exit. In 2014, he was called by the Guinea-Bissau national team.

Dabó was selected for the 2017 Africa Cup of Nations by manager Baciro Candé, even though he did not have a club at the time. He earned his first cap on 14 January in the group stage opener, playing the full 90 minutes in a 1–1 draw against Gabon.

References

External links

1993 births
Living people
Bissau-Guinean emigrants to Portugal
Portuguese people of Bissau-Guinean descent
Sportspeople from Bissau
Bissau-Guinean footballers
Portuguese footballers
Association football defenders
Primeira Liga players
Liga Portugal 2 players
Campeonato de Portugal (league) players
S.C. Braga B players
S.C. Braga players
F.C. Arouca players
S.C. Farense players
Moldovan Super Liga players
FC Dacia Chișinău players
Liga II players
FC Metaloglobus București players
Serie C players
F.C. Rieti players
Slovak Super Liga players
ŠKF Sereď players
Portugal youth international footballers
Guinea-Bissau international footballers
2017 Africa Cup of Nations players
2019 Africa Cup of Nations players
Bissau-Guinean expatriate footballers
Expatriate footballers in Moldova
Expatriate footballers in Romania
Expatriate footballers in Italy
Expatriate footballers in Slovakia
Bissau-Guinean expatriate sportspeople in Moldova
Bissau-Guinean expatriate sportspeople in Romania
Bissau-Guinean expatriate sportspeople in Italy
Bissau-Guinean expatriate sportspeople in Slovakia